Shipwreck on the Norwegian Coast or Shipwreck on the Coast of Norway (Norwegian - Skibbrudd ved den norske kyst) is an 1832 marine painting by Johan Christian Dahl. It is now in the National Gallery of Norway, to which it was left in 1931 by Louise and Johannes G. Heftye.

Dahl had already painted a first version of the work in 1819, and painted several others in his career, inspired by his five long voyages along the coast of Norway. A smaller variant is in the Bergen Billedgalleri.

References

1832 paintings
Maritime paintings
Paintings by Johan Christian Dahl
Paintings in the collection of the National Gallery (Norway)